The Vickers Wellington was a British twin-engined, long-range medium bomber. It was designed during the mid-1930s at Brooklands in Weybridge, Surrey. Led by Vickers-Armstrongs' chief designer Rex Pierson; a key feature of the aircraft is its geodetic airframe fuselage structure, which was principally designed by Barnes Wallis. Development had been started in response to Air Ministry Specification B.9/32, issued in the middle of 1932, for a bomber for the Royal Air Force.

This specification called for a twin-engined day bomber capable of delivering higher performance than any previous design. Other aircraft developed to the same specification include the Armstrong Whitworth Whitley and the Handley Page Hampden. During the development process, performance requirements such as for the tare weight changed substantially, and the engine used was not the one originally intended.

The Wellington was used as a night bomber in the early years of the Second World War, performing as one of the principal bombers used by Bomber Command. During 1943, it started to be superseded as a bomber by the larger four-engined "heavies" such as the Avro Lancaster.  The Wellington continued to serve throughout the war in other duties, particularly as an anti-submarine aircraft.

It holds the distinction of having been the only British bomber that was produced for the duration of the war, and of having been produced in a greater quantity than any other British-built bomber.  The Wellington remained as first-line equipment when the war ended, although it had been increasingly relegated to secondary roles.  The Wellington was one of two bombers named after Arthur Wellesley, 1st Duke of Wellington, the other being the Vickers Wellesley.

A larger heavy bomber aircraft designed to Specification B.1/35, the Vickers Warwick, was developed in parallel with the Wellington; the two aircraft shared around 85% of their structural components. Many elements of the Wellington were also re-used in a civil derivative, the Vickers VC.1 Viking.

Development

Origins

In October 1932, the British Air Ministry invited Vickers to tender for the recently issued Specification B.9/32, which sought a twin-engine medium daylight bomber. In response, Vickers conducted a design study, led by Chief Designer Rex Pierson. Early on, Vickers' chief structures designer Barnes Wallis proposed the use of a geodetic airframe, inspired by his previous work on airships and the single-engined Wellesley light bomber. During structural testing performed at the Royal Aircraft Establishment, Farnborough, the proposed structure demonstrated not only the required strength factor of six, but reached 11 without any sign of failure, proving the geodetic airframe to possess a strength far in excess of normal levels. This strength allowed for the structure design to be further developed to reduce the size of individual members and adopt simplified standard sections of lighter construction.

Vickers studied and compared the performance of various air- and liquid-cooled engines to power the bomber, including the Bristol Pegasus IS2, Pegasus IIS2, and Armstrong Siddeley Tiger radials, and the Rolls-Royce Goshawk I inline. The Pegasus was selected as the engine for air-cooled versions of the bomber, while the Goshawk engine was chosen for the liquid-cooled engine variant. On 28 February 1933, two versions of the aircraft, one with each of the selected powerplants, were submitted to the tender. In September 1933, the Air Ministry issued a pilot contract for the Goshawk-powered version. In August 1934, Vickers proposed to use either the Pegasus or the sleeve-valve Bristol Perseus engines instead of the evaporative-cooled Goshawk, which promised improvements in speed, climb rate, ceiling, and single-engine flight capabilities without any major increase in all-up weight; the Air Ministry accepted the proposed changes.

Other refinements of the design had also been implemented and approved, such as the adoption of variable-pitch propellers, and the use of Vickers-produced gun turrets in the nose and tail positions. By December 1936, the specification had been revised to include front, rear, and midship wind-protected turret mountings. Other specification changes included modified bomb undershields and the inclusion of spring-loaded bomb bay doors. The proposal had also been developed further, a mid-wing arrangement was adopted instead of a shoulder-mounted wing for greater pilot visibility during formation flight and improved aerodynamic performance, as well as a substantially increased overall weight of the aircraft. Design studies were also conducted on behalf of the Air Ministry into the adoption of the Rolls-Royce Merlin engine.

In spite of a traditional preference of the establishment to strictly adhere to the restrictive tare weight for the aircraft established in the tender, both Pierson and Wallis firmly believed that their design should adopt the most powerful engine available.

During the development phase of the aircraft, "the political and military climate of Europe was changing rapidly. The threats of the dictators of Germany and Italy began to exert pressure on the British Government to make a reappraisal of the strength of its armed forces, especially that of the Royal Air Force". By 1936, the need for a high priority to be placed on the creation of a large bomber force, which would form the spearhead of British offensive power, had been recognised; accordingly, a new command organisation within the RAF, Bomber Command, was formed that year to deliver upon this requirement.

Prototype and design revision
In early 1936, an initial prototype, K4049, which was originally designated as a Type 271, was assembled. The prototype could accommodate a payload of nine 250lb or 500lb bombs, and both nose and tail gun positions were fitted with hand-operated turrets with a gun in eachl; provision for a third retractable gun in a dorsal position was made. It had provision for a crew of four, along with a fifth position for special duties.

On 5 June 1936, the name Crecy was chosen for the type, and it was publicly displayed as such. On 15 August 1936, the aircraft was accepted for production. On 8 September 1936, the name Wellington was adopted for the type; it fitted with Air Ministry nomenclature of naming bombers after towns and followed the Vickers Wellesley in referring to the Napoleonic War general Arthur Wellesley, the Duke of Wellington. On 12 December 1936, a corresponding works order was issued for the Wellington.

On 15 June 1936, K4049 conducted its maiden flight from Brooklands. Vickers chief test pilot Joseph Summers flew K4049 on its first flight, accompanied by Wallis and Trevor Westbrook. The aircraft soon came to be widely regarded as being an advanced design for its era and proved to have considerable merit during its flight trials. On 19 April 1937, K4049 was destroyed by an accident during a service test flight by Maurice Hare. The cause was the failure of the elevator's horn balance due to excessive slipstream exposure, leading to the aircraft inverting and rapidly descending into terrain. It was destroyed in the crash, which also resulted in the death of the navigator, Smurthwaite. The horn balances were later deleted from the design and were not on production aircraft.

Refinement of the Wellington's design was influenced by the issuing of Specifications B.3/34 and B.1/35, the latter of which had led to the parallel development of a larger bomber aircraft, the Vickers Warwick. According to Andrews, the Wellington was practically redesigned to form the first production model of the aircraft, during which many features associated with the Warwick were added, such as a deepened fuselage, a lengthened nose, a reshaped elevator and an increased crew complement for four to five members. Other changes made included the adoption of a retractable tailwheel and constant-speed propellers; the Air Ministry also requested the adoption of a Nash & Thompson-design ventral turret in place of the Vickers design.

On 23 December 1937, the first production Wellington Mk I, L4212, conducted its first flight, followed by an intensive flight programme. Flight trials with L4212 confirmed the aerodynamic stability initially encountered by K4049, but also revealed the aircraft to be nose-heavy during dives, which was attributed to the redesigned elevator. Modifications, including the linking of the flaps and the elevator trim tabs, were tested on L4212 and resolved the problem.

Production

In August 1936, an initial order for 180 Wellington Mk I aircraft, powered by a pair of 1,050 hp (780 kW) Bristol Pegasus radial engines, was received by Vickers; it had been placed so rapidly that the order occurred prior to the first meeting intended to decide the details of the production aircraft.

In October 1937, another order for a further 100 Wellington Mk Is, produced by the Gloster Aircraft Company, was issued; it was followed by an order for 100 Wellington Mk II aircraft with Rolls-Royce Merlin X V12 engines. Yet another order was placed for 64 Wellingtons produced by Armstrong Whitworth Aircraft. With this flurry of order and production having been assured by the end of 1937, Vickers set about simplifying the manufacturing process of the aircraft and announced a target of building one Wellington per day.

The geodetic design took longer to build than comparable aircraft using the more conventional monocoque approach, leading to some criticism of the Wellington. In addition it was difficult to cut holes in the fuselage for access or equipment fixtures; to aid manufacturing, the Leigh light was deployed through the mounting for the absent FN9 ventral turret.

In the late 1930s, Vickers built Wellingtons at a rate of one per day at Weybridge and 50 a month at Broughton in North Wales. Many of the employees on the production lines were only semi-skilled and new to aircraft construction. Peak wartime production in 1942 saw monthly rates of 70 at Weybridge, 130 at Broughton and 102 at Blackpool.  Shadow factories were set up to produce parts for the Wellington all over the British Isles.

In October 1943, as a propaganda and morale-boosting exercise, workers at Broughton gave up their weekend to build Wellington number LN514 rushed by the clock. The bomber was assembled in 23 hours 50 minutes, and took off after 24 hours 48 minutes, beating the record of 48 hours set by a factory in California. Each Wellington was usually built within 60 hours. It was filmed for the Ministry of Information for a newsreel Worker's Week-End, and was broadcast in both Britain and America. It was the first time in aviation history that an aircraft manufacturer anywhere in the world had attempted such a feat with a metal aircraft of this scale.

A total of 180 Wellington Mk I aircraft were built; 150 for the RAF and 30 for the Royal New Zealand Air Force (RNZAF) (which were transferred to the RAF on the outbreak of war and used by 75 Squadron). In October 1938, the Mk I entered service with 9 Squadron. The Wellington was initially outnumbered by the Handley Page Hampden (also ordered by the Ministry to B.9/32) and the Armstrong Whitworth Whitley (to B.34/3 for a 'night' bomber) but outlasted both rival aircraft in service. The Wellington went on to be built in 16 variants and two post-war training conversions. The number of Wellingtons built totalled 11,462 of all versions, a greater quantity produced than any other British bomber. On 13 October 1945, the last Wellington to be produced rolled out.

Further development

The Wellington Mk I was quickly superseded by improved variants. Improvements to the turrets and the strengthening of the undercarriage quickly resulted in the Wellington Mk IA. According to Andrews, the IA model bore more similarities to the later Wellington Mk II than to its Mk I predecessor. Due to armament difficulties encountered that left the Wellington with weaker than intended defences, the Wellington Mk IB was proposed for trials but appears to have been unbuilt. Further development of various aspects of the aircraft, such as the hydraulics and electrical systems, along with a revision of the ventral turret gun, led to the Wellington Mk IC.

In January 1938, design work on what would become the Wellington Mk II formally commenced. The principal change on this model was the adoption of the Merlin engine in place of the Pegasus XVIII; other modifications included hydraulic and oxygen system revisions along with the installation of cabin heating and an astrodome. On 3 March 1939, L4250, the prototype Mk II, performed its maiden flight; this had been delayed due to production delays of its Merlin X engines. Stability and balance problems were encountered during flight tests of the prototype, resulting in further changes such as the enlargement of the tailplane. By late 1939, the Mk II was capable of delivering superior performance to the Mk IC, such as higher cruising and top speeds, increased all-up weight or alternatively greater range and a raised ceiling.

Design

The Vickers Wellington was a twin-engined long-range medium bomber, initially powered by a pair of Bristol Pegasus radial engines, which drove a pair of de Havilland two-pitch propellers. Various engines and propeller combinations were used on variants of the aircraft, which included models of the Bristol Hercules and the Rolls-Royce Merlin engines. Recognisable characteristics of the Wellington include the high aspect ratio of its tapered wing, the depth of its fuselage and the use of a tall single fin on its tail unit, which reportedly aided in recognition of the type.

The Wellington typically had a crew of five, the bomb-aimer being locatedin the aircraft's nose. The Wellington could be fitted with dual flight controls, and specialised dual-control conversion sets were developed for the purpose of performing training upon the type. The cockpit also contained provisions for heating and de-icing equipment, which was introduced on later models of the Wellington. Additional munitions and an expanded bombing capacity were changes in many of the wartime variants of the Wellington, including the carrying of larger bombs.

Defensive armament comprised the forward and tail turret gun positions, along with a retractable revolving ventral turret. Due to the high cruising speeds of the Wellington, it had been realised that fully enclosed turrets, as opposed to semi-enclosed or exposed turrets, would be necessary; the turrets were also power-operated to traverse with the speed and manoeuvrability necessary to keep up with the new generations of opposing fighter aircraft. Due to the specialised nature of increasingly advanced turrets, these were treated as ancillary equipment, being designed and supplied independently and replacing Vickers' own turrets developed for the aircraft. The turrets initially used a Nash & Thompson control unit, while each position was equipped with a pair of .303 in (7.7 mm) Browning machine guns. On many Wellington variants, the Vickers-built ventral turret of the Mk I was replaced by a Nash & Thompson-built counterpart as standard.

A novelty of the Wellington was its geodetic construction, devised by aircraft designer and inventor Barnes Wallis. The fuselage was built from 1,650 elements, consisting of duralumin W-beams which formed into a metal framework. Wooden battens were screwed to the beams and were covered with Irish linen; the linen, treated with layers of dope, formed the outer skin of the aircraft. The construction proved to be compatible with significant adaptations and alterations including greater all-up weight, larger bombs, tropicalisation and long-range fuel tanks.

The metal lattice gave the structure considerable strength, with any stringer able to support a portion of load from the opposite side of the aircraft. Damaged or destroyed beams on one side could still leave the aircraft structure viable; as a result, Wellingtons with huge areas of framework missing were often able to return when other types would not have survived, leading to stories of the aircraft's "invulnerability". The effect was enhanced by the fabric skin occasionally burning off leaving the naked frames exposed. A further advantage of the geodetic construction of the wings was its enabling of a unique method for housing the fuel, with each wing containing three fuel tanks within the unobstructed space provided between the front and rear spars outboard of the engines.

Operational history

On 3 September 1939, the eve of the outbreak of the Second World War, No. 3 Group Bomber Command comprised eight squadrons (No. 9, No. 37, No. 37 No. 38, No. 99, No. 115 and No. 149 Squadrons), with two reserve squadrons (No. 214 and No. 215 squadrons), that were equipped with a mixture of Wellington Mk I and Mk IA aircraft.

On 4 September 1939, less than 24 hours after the commencement of hostilities, a total of 14 Wellingtons of No. 9 and No. 149 Squadrons, alongside a number of Bristol Blenheim aircraft, performed the first RAF bombing raid of the war, against German shipping at Brunsbüttel. The bombing of the harbour had not been permitted by Chamberlain's War Cabinet for fear of injuring civilians. The effectiveness of the raid was diminished by poor weather and high amounts of anti-aircraft fire. A pair of Wellingtons became the first aircraft to be lost on the Western Front.

On 3 December 1939, 24 Wellingtons of No. 38, No. 115 and No. 147 Squadrons attacked the German fleet moored at Heligoland. The bombing commenced from high altitude and, while results of the bombing itself proved negligible, the ability of a formation of Wellingtons to penetrate strongly defended hostile airspace was validated. On 14 December 1939, 12 Wellingtons of No. 99 Squadron conducted a low-level raid upon German shipping at the Schillig Roads and Wilhelmshaven. Encountering enemy fire from warships, flak, and Luftwaffe aircraft, the Wellington formation lost five aircraft, along with another that crashed near its base, while only one enemy fighter was shot down.

On 18 December 1939, 24 Wellingtons of No. 9, No. 37 and No. 149 Squadrons participated in the Battle of the Heligoland Bight against the German fleet and naval bases in both the Schillig Roads and Wilhelmshaven. The Wellingtons were unable to drop their bombs as all vessels were in harbour, thus restrictions on endangering civilians prevented their engagement. Having been alerted by radar, Luftwaffe fighter aircraft intercepted the incoming bombers near to Heligoland and attacked the formation for much of the way home. Twelve of the bombers were destroyed and a further three were badly damaged. The Wellingtons shot down four aircraft.

The action at Heligoland highlighted the Wellington's vulnerability to attacking fighters, possessing neither self-sealing fuel tanks nor sufficient defensive armament. The nose and tail turrets protected against attacks from the front and rear, the Wellington had no defences against attacks from the beam and above, as it had not been believed that such attacks were possible owing to the high speed of aircraft involved. Unescorted day bombing was abandoned and Bomber Command decided to use the Wellington force to attack German communications and industrial targets instead.

The Wellington was converted for night operations; on 25 August 1940, the type participated in the first night raid on Berlin. During the First 1,000 bomber raid, on Cologne on 30 May 1942, 599 out of 1,046 RAF aircraft dispatched were Wellingtons; of these, 101 were flown by Polish aircrew. During operations under Bomber Command, Wellingtons flew 47,409 operations, dropped 41,823 tons (37,941 tonnes) of bombs and lost 1,332 aircraft in action.

In one incident, a German Messerschmitt Bf 110 night-fighter attacked a Wellington returning from an attack on Münster, causing a fire at the rear of the starboard engine. The second pilot, Sergeant James Allen Ward (RNZAF) climbed out of the fuselage, kicked holes in the doped fabric of the wing for foot and hand holds to reach the starboard engine and smothered the burning upper wing covering. He and the aircraft returned home safely and Ward was awarded the Victoria Cross.

The Wellington was also adopted by RAF Coastal Command, in which it contributed to the Battle of the Atlantic. It was used for anti-submarine operations; on 6 July 1942, a Wellington sank its first enemy vessel. Specialised  variants, fitted with a  diameter metal hoop, were used for exploding German magnetic mines by generating a powerful magnetic field as it passed over them. In 1944, Wellingtons of Coastal Command were sent to Greece and performed various support duties during the British intervention in the Greek Civil War. A few Wellingtons were operated by the Hellenic Air Force.

While the Wellington was superseded in the European Theatre, it remained in operational service for much of the war in the Middle East and in 1942, Wellingtons based in India became the RAF's first long-range bomber operating in the Far East. It was particularly effective with the South African Air Force in North Africa. The Wellington also served in anti-submarine duties with 26 Squadron SAAF based in Takoradi, Gold Coast (now Ghana).

In late 1944, a radar-equipped Wellington XIV from 407 Sqn. RCAF was modified for use by the RAF's Fighter Interception Unit as what would now be described as an airborne early warning and control aircraft. The FIU operators on the Wellington would search for the He 111 aircraft climbing to launch altitude, then direct the Beaufighter to the bomber, while the Mosquito would attempt to intercept the V-1 if launched.

The Wellington is listed in the appendix to the novel KG 200 as one flown by the German secret operations unit KG 200, which also tested, evaluated and sometimes clandestinely operated captured enemy aircraft during the Second World War.

Variants

Bomber variants

Type 271 The first Wellington bomber prototype.

Type 285 Wellington Mark I One pre-production prototype. Powered by two Bristol Pegasus X radial piston engines.

Type 290 Wellington Mark I The first production version. Powered by two 1,000 hp (750 kW) Bristol Pegasus XVIII radial piston engines. Fitted with Vickers gun turrets, 183 built at Weybridge and Broughton in Flintshire.

Type 408 Wellington Mark IA Production version built to B Mark II specifications with provision for either Pegasus or Rolls-Royce Merlin engines, although only 1,000 hp (750 kW) Pegasus XVIII engines were used in practice. Main landing gear moved forward 3 in (8 cm). Fitted with Nash & Thompson gun turrets. 187 built at Weybridge and Broughton in Flintshire.

Type 416 Wellington Mark IC The first main production variant was the Mark IC which added waist guns to the Mark IA. A total of 2,685 were produced. The Mark IC had a crew of six: a pilot, radio operator, navigator/bomb aimer, observer/nose gunner, tail gunner and waist gunner. A total of 2,685 were built at Weybridge, Broughton in Flintshire and Blackpool.

Type 406 Wellington Mark II The B Mark II was identical to the Mark IC with the exception of the powerplant; using the 1,145 hp (855 kW) Rolls-Royce Merlin X engine instead. A total of 401 were produced at Weybridge.

Type 417 Wellington B Mark III The next significant variant was the B Mark III which featured the  Bristol Hercules III or XI engine and a four-gun tail turret, instead of two-gun. A total of 1,519 Mark IIIs were built, becoming mainstays of Bomber Command from late 1941 through into 1942, with all but the two prototypes being built at Broughton in Flintshire and at Blackpool. After trials in 1942, the Wellington III was cleared it to tow Hotspur, Hadrian and Horsa gliders, although this was observed to have an adverse effect on the geodetic structure. The Wellington III was also seen over Salisbury Plain while towing Spitfires. This would have allowed Spitfire reinforcements for the defence of Malta to be towed from Gibraltar to within range of Malta before being released. Whether this was done is unconfirmed.

Type 424 Wellington B Mark IV The 220 B Mark IV Wellingtons used the 1,200 hp (900 kW) Pratt & Whitney Twin Wasp engine and were flown by two Polish and two RAAF squadrons. A total of 220 were built at Broughton in Flintshire.

Type 442 Wellington B Mark VI Pressurised with a long wingspan and 1,600 hp (1,190 kW) Merlin R6SM (60-series, two-stage) engines, 63 were produced and were operated by 109 Squadron and as Gee radio navigation trainers. A total of 63 were built at Weybridge. The B.VI's high-altitude fuselage design optimised for pressurisation had a solid, bullet-like nose with no nose turret, and a cockpit with an astrodome-like bubble canopy.  This is the aircraft that spurred Rolls-Royce into developing the two-stage supercharged Merlin 60-series engine.

Type 440 Wellington B Mark X The most widely produced variant of which 3,804 were built. It was similar to the Mark III except for the 1,675 hp (1,250 kW) Hercules XVIII powerplant. The Mark X was the basis for a number of Coastal Command versions. A total of 3,803 were built at Broughton in Flintshire and Blackpool.

Coastal Command variants
Type 429 Wellington GR Mark VIII Mark IC conversion for Coastal Command service. Roles included reconnaissance, anti-submarine and anti-shipping attack. A Coastal Command Wellington was the first aircraft to be fitted with the anti-submarine Leigh light. A total of 307 were built at Weybridge, 58 fitted with the Leigh Light.

Type 458 Wellington GR Mark XI Maritime version of B Mark X with an ordinary nose turret and mast radar ASV Mark II radar instead of chin radome, no waist guns, 180 built at Weybridge and Blackpool.

Type 455 Wellington GR Mark XII Maritime version of B Mark X armed with torpedoes and with a chin radome housing the ASV Mark III radar, single nose machine gun, 58 built at Weybridge and Broughton in Flintshire.

Type 466 Wellington GR Mark XIII Maritime version of B Mark X with an ordinary nose turret and mast radar ASV Mark II instead of chin radome, no waist guns, 844 built Weybridge and Blackpool.

Type 467 Wellington GR Mark XIV Maritime version of B Mark X with a chin radome housing the ASV Mark III radar and RP-3 explosive rocket rails under the wings. 841 built at Weybridge, Broughton in Flintshire and Blackpool.

Transport variants
Wellington C Mark XV Service conversions of the Wellington Mark IA into unarmed transport aircraft; able to carry up to 18 troops.

Wellington C Mark XVI Service conversions of the Wellington Mark IC into unarmed transport aircraft; able to carry up to 18 troops.

Trainer variants
Type 487 Wellington T Mark XVII Service conversions of the Wellington bomber into training aircraft with Air Intercept radar; powered by two Bristol Hercules XVII radial piston engines.

Type 490 Wellington T Mark XVIII Production version. Powered by two Bristol Hercules XVI radial piston engines. A total of 80 were built at Blackpool, plus some conversions.

Wellington T Mark XIX Service conversions of the Wellington Mark X used for navigation training; remained in use as a trainer until 1953.

Type 619 Wellington T Mark X Postwar conversions of the Wellington Bomber into training aircraft by Boulton Paul in Wolverhampton. For navigation training the front turret was removed and replaced by a fairing and the interior re-equipped. Some were sold to France and Greece.

Experimental and conversion variants
Type 298 Wellington Mark II prototype one aircraft L4250; powered by two 1,145 hp (854 kW) Rolls-Royce Merlin inline piston engines.

Type 299 Wellington Mark III  prototype two only.

Type 410 Wellington Mark IV prototype Serial R1220; powered by two Pratt & Whitney Twin Wasp radial piston engines.

Type 416 Wellington (II) The original Wellington II prototype was converted with the installation of a 40 mm (1.57 in) Vickers S gun in the dorsal position.

Type 418 Wellington DWI (Detonation Without Impact) Mark I Conversion of four Wellington Mark IAs to minesweeping aircraft for exploding magnetic mines. Fitted with Ford V-8 petrol engine and Mawdsley electrical generator to induce magnetic field in a  diameter loop mounted under fuselage. They had a solid nose with a bracket supporting the loop, which was also supported under the rear fuselage and the wings, outboard of the engines. DWI was also known as "Directional Wireless Installation" – to mislead the true purpose of the loop.

Type 419 Wellington DWI Mark II DWI Mark I aircraft upgraded by installation of de Havilland Gipsy Six engine for increased generation power. 11 aircraft were converted to this standard. They were operated by No. 1 General Reconnaissance Unit, RAF, sweeping mines in the Thames Estuary for a short time until the Royal Navy had an equivalent capability to sweep magnetic mines. The unit was transferred to Egypt for use in the Suez Canal.

Type 407 and Type 421 Wellington Mark V Second and first prototypes respectively: three were built, designed for pressurised, high-altitude operations using turbocharged Hercules VIII engines.

Wellington Mark VI One Wellington Mark V with Merlin 60-series engines, high-altitude prototype only.

Type 449 Wellington Mark VIG Production version of Type 431. Two aircraft were only built.

Wellington Mark VII Single aircraft, built as a testbed for the 40 mm Vickers S gun turret.

Type 435 Wellington Mark IC conversion of one Wellington to test Turbinlite.

Type 437 Wellington Mark IX one Mark IC conversion for troop transport.

Type 439 Wellington Mark II one Wellington Mark II was converted with the installation of a 40 mm Vickers S gun in the nose.

Type 443 Wellington Mark V one Wellington was used to test the Bristol Hercules VIII engine.

Type 445 Wellington (I) one Wellington was used to test the Whittle W2B/23 turbojet engine, the engine was fitted in the tail of the aircraft.

Type 454 and Type 459 Wellington Mark IX prototypes with ASV Mark II, ASV Mark III radars, and powered by two Bristol Hercules VI and XVI radial piston engines.

Type 470 and Type 486 Wellington This designation covers two Wellington Mark II aircraft fitted with the Whittle W2B and W2/700 respectively.

Type 478 Wellington Mark X one Wellington was used to test the Bristol Hercules 100 engine.

Type 602 Wellington Mark X one Wellington was fitted with two Rolls-Royce Dart turboprop engines.

Wellington Mark III one Wellington was used for glider tug, for glider clearance for Hadrian, Hotspur and Horsa gliders.

Total built
A total number of 11,461 aircraft is most often quoted There is some question over several individual aircraft, so the actual total may be a few either side of this figure. In combination, the Wellingtons and 846 Warwicks represent over 75% of the total number of aircraft built by the Vickers-Armstrong company.

Operators

Aircraft on display

There are two complete surviving Vickers Wellingtons preserved in the United Kingdom. Some other substantial parts also survive.
 Wellington IA serial number N2980 is owned by Brooklands Museum at Brooklands, Surrey. Built at Brooklands and first flown in November 1939, this aircraft took part in the RAF's daylight bombing raids on Germany early in the Second World War but later lost power during a training flight on 31 December 1940 and ditched in Loch Ness. All the occupants survived except the rear gunner, who was killed when his parachute failed to open. The aircraft was recovered from the bottom of Loch Ness in September 1985 and restored in the late 1980s and 1990s. A new Wellington exhibition featuring N2980 was officially opened by Robin Holmes (who led the recovery team), Penelope Keith (as trustee of Brooklands Museum), Norman Parker (who worked for Vickers) and Ken Wallis (who flew Wellingtons operationally) on 15 June 2011, the 75th anniversary of the first flight of the type's effective prototype in 1936.

On 15 September 2016, after having its outer wings removed the day before, N2980 was towed from the Bellman hangar in which it was restored and where it had been displayed for nearly 30 years. This move was the first time that 'R' for 'Robert' had moved on its undercarriage since its last flight in 1940. The aircraft was exhibited in a temporary building while the Bellman hangar was relocated and restored until taken off display and moved back into the latter building on 25 July 2017. The aeroplane is the centre-piece of the 'Brooklands Aircraft Factory' exhibition about the aircraft industry at Brooklands, which was formally opened on 13 November 2017.

 Wellington T.10 serial number MF628 is held by the Royal Air Force Museum. It was delivered to RAF No.18 MU (Maintenance Unit) for storage at RAF Tinwald Downs, Dumfries, as a Wellington B.X, on 11 May 1944. In March 1948 the front gun turret was removed in its conversion to a T.10 for its role as a postwar aircrew trainer. This aircraft is the Wellington seen taking off in The Dam Busters and was also used for some air-to-air photography on the movie.

This aircraft made the last flight of a Wellington, from Aston Down to Wisley, in January 1955. The RAF Museum later refitted the front gun turret in keeping with its original build as a B.X (wartime mark numbers used Roman numerals, Arabic numerals were adopted postwar). In Autumn 2010, this aircraft was taken to the RAF Museum's site at Cosford for restoration.

Specifications (Wellington Mark IC)

In popular culture
 The Wellington was nicknamed the Wimpy by RAF personnel, after the portly J. Wellington Wimpy character from the Popeye cartoons.
 Nebeští jezdci ("Riders in the Sky") (1968), about a Czechoslovakian bomber crew in the RAF, based on the real operations of No. 311 Squadron RAF.
 Pastoral is a 1944 novel by the author Nevil Shute about the crew of a Wellington
 Target for Tonight (1941), a documentary about a Wellington on a raid over Germany.
 Worker's Week-End (1943), a documentary newsreel about the construction of Vickers Wellington LN514 in record time.
 One of Our Aircraft is Missing a 1942 British war film.
 A straight on the Silverstone Circuit is named the Wellington Straight in reference to the type being based at what was then named RAF Silverstone.
 G – for Genevieve and L for Lucy, both about fictional Polish bomber crews in the RAF during World War 2, by Janusz Meissner

See also

References

Notes

Citations

Bibliography
 Andrews, C. F. The Vickers Wellington I & II (Aircraft in Profile 125). Leatherhead, Surrey: Profile Publications, 1967. No ISBN.
 Andrews, C.F and E.B. Morgan. Vickers Aircraft since 1908. London: Putnam, 1988. .
 Bowman, Martin. Wellington, The Geodetic Giant. Shrewsbury, UK: Airlife Publishing Ltd., 1989. .
 Bowyer, Chaz. Wellington at War. Shepperton, Surrey: Ian Allan Ltd., 1982. .
 Bowyer, Chaz. Wellington Bomber. London: William Kimber & Co Ltd., 1986. .
 Cooksley, Peter G. Wellington, Mainstay of Bomber Command. Wellingborough, Northamptonshire: Patrick Stephens Ltd., 1987. .
Cooling, Rupert. "Under Cover of Darkness... The Wellington at War". Air Enthusiast. No. 13, August–November 1980. pp. 63–71. 
 Crosby, Francis. The World Encyclopedia of Bombers. London: Anness Publishing Ltd., 2007. .
 Delve, Ken. Vickers Armstrong Wellington. Ramsbury, Wiltshire, UK: The Crowood Press Ltd., 1998. .
 Flintham, V. Air Wars and Aircraft: A Detailed Record of Air Combat, 1945 to the Present. New York: Facts on File, 1990. .
 Gilman J.D. and J. Clive. KG 200. London: Pan Books Ltd., 1978. .
 Hall, Alan W. Vickers Wellington, Warpaint Series No. 10. Husborne Crawley, Berfordshire: Hall Park Books Ltd., 1997. No ISBN.
 Jackson, Robert. Britain's Greatest Aircraft. Barnsley, UK: Pen & Sword Books Ltd., 2007. .
 Jackson, Robert, ed. 101 Great Bombers. New York: Rosen Publishing Group, 2010. .
 Lihou, Maurice. Out of the Italian Night: Wellington Bomber Operations 1944–45. Shrewsbury, UK: Airlife Publishing Ltd., 2003. .
 Lumsden, Alec. Wellington Special. Shepperton, Surrey: Ian Allan Ltd., 1974. .
 Mackay, Ron. Wellington in Action, Aircraft Number 76. Carrollton, Texas: Squadron/Signal Publications, Inc., 1986. .
 Murray, Dr. Iain Bouncing-Bomb Man: The Science of Sir Barnes Wallis. Haynes, 2009. .
 Murray, Dr. Iain Vickers Wellington Manual. Haynes, 2012. .
 Ovčáčík, Michal and Karel Susa. Vickers-Armstrongs Wellington Medium Bomber variants. Prague, Czech Republic: 4+ Publications, 2003. .
 Richards, Denis. The Hardest Victory: RAF Bomber Command in the Second World War. London: Coronet Books, 1995. .
 Richards, Denis. Royal Air Force 1939–1945: Volume I The Fight at Odds. London: HMSO, 1953.

 Tarring, Trevor and Mark Joseland. Archie Frazer-Nash .. Engineer. London: The Frazer Nash Archives, 2011. .

External links

RAF – Vickers Wellington
A Polish Wellington bomber pilot recalls his war
Cover Illustration  August 1940 Popular Mechanics
Wellington at the International Bomber Command Centre Digital Archive

1930s British bomber aircraft
Wellington
World War II British bombers
Mid-wing aircraft
Aircraft first flown in 1936
Twin piston-engined tractor aircraft
Barnes Wallis